Alhaj Babu Muhammad Rafique Kahloon is a former member of the Provincial Assembly of West Pakistan from Loralai, serving in the fifth and sixth assemblies from June 9, 1962, until March 25, 1969.

References

Politicians from Punjab, Pakistan
Members of the Provincial Assembly of the Punjab